The 2013–14 season is PAS Hamedan's 3rd season in the Azadegan League.

First-team squad

First-team squad
as of September 21, 2013

For recent transfers, see List of Iranian football transfers summer 2013''.

Transfers

Summer 

In:

 

Out:

Competitions

Results summary

Results by round

Matches

See also
 2013–14 Azadegan League
 2013–14 Hazfi Cup

References

PAS Hamedan F.C. seasons
Pas Hamedan